M. darwinii may refer to:
Marilyna darwinii
Moruloidea darwinii
Mylodon darwinii, an extinct genus of giant ground sloth

See also
 M. darwini (disambiguation)
 Darwinii (disambiguation)